The sack of Madeira occurred in 1617 when Algerian pirates sacked the Island and took 1,200 inhabitants as slaves.

The Algerians had established a base on the Islands of Cape Verde from which they operated against ships in the Atlantic.

In 1617 the Algerians arrived in Madeira with 8 vessels and 800 men. They plundered the Island and enslaved 1,200 inhabitants. The Algerians burned the archives and had sacked much even the church bells. It is also said that they had emptied the Portuguese Island of Porto Santo enslaving 663 inhabitants.

The activity of the Algerian pirates only seemed to increase later sacking Baltimore in Ireland as well as the famous raid in Iceland.

References

History of Madeira
1617 in military history
Barbary pirates